Barstow is a surname. Notable people with the surname include:

Arthur Edward Barstow (1888–1942), officer in the British Indian Army
David Barstow (born 1963), American journalist
Gamaliel H. Barstow (1784–1865), American representative from NY 1831–1833
George Barstow (1874–1966), British civil servant
Gideon Barstow (1783–1852), American representative from Massachusetts
John Anderson Barstow (1893–1941), British Army officer and brother of Arthur Edward Barstow
John L. Barstow (1832–1913), American teacher and politician
Josephine Barstow (born 1940), English soprano
Stan Barstow (1928–2011), English novelist
Susie M. Barstow (1836–1923), American painter
Percy Barstow (1883–1969), UK Member of Parliament 1941–1950
William A. Barstow (1813–1865), third governor of Wisconsin

Fictional person:
 Bonnie Barstow, character in the Knight Rider TV series

See also
Bartow (name)